Vallabha is an Indian philosopher.

Vallabha or Vallabh may also refer to: 

 Vallabha (name), a list of people with the name
 Vishnuvallabha, a name for Ocimum tenuiflorum
 Vallabha (title), a title used by several kings

See also
Balhara (title), Arabic transliteration of the name and title
Prithvi Vallabh (disambiguation)